Emperor Jingyuan may refer to:

Yao Yizhong (280–352), ethnic Qiang warlord and general, ancestor of the Later Qin emperors
Hanpu ( 10th century), ethnic Jurchen chieftain, ancestor of the Jin emperors